"Love & History" is the fourth single by Japanese singer and voice actress Nana Mizuki. It was released together with her fifth single "Power Gate."

Track listing 
LOVE&HISTORY
Lyrics: Chokkyu Murano
Composition: Ataru Sumiyoshi
Arrangement: Nobuhiro Makino
Theme song for PS2 game Generation of Chaos
Summer Sweet
Lyrics: Chokkyu Murano
Composition: Takeshi
Arrangement: Nobuhiro Makino
LOVE&HISTORY (Vocalless Ver.)
Summer Sweet (Vocalless Ver.)

2002 singles
Nana Mizuki songs